Oleksandr Vasylyovych Halunenko is a Ukrainian test pilot, Honoured Test Pilot of the USSR, the president of the Ukrainian Federation of Aeronautical Sports (member of the Fédération Aéronautique Internationale), and recipient of the title Hero of Ukraine. 

He is known for testing such airplanes as the Antonov An-124 Ruslan and the super giant Antonov An-225 Mriya.

Halunenko received the Hero of Ukraine award for manually landing the second prototype of the Antonov An-70 successfully, after malfunctions of the electronic control system occurred during its April 1997 initial flight. After retiring from flying in 2004, he served a single term in the Ukrainian parliament beginning in 2006. A resident of Bucha, Ukraine, Halunenko survived the battle of Bucha during the 2022 Russian invasion of Ukraine.

References

External links
 "Лётчик Александр Галуненко: при СССР государство относилось к авиапрому более ответственно" ("The pilot Oleksandr Halunenko: during the Soviet Union, the state was more responsible towards aviation industry"), Glavred, 22 September 2016

1946 births
Living people
People from Zaporizhzhia Oblast
Fifth convocation members of the Verkhovna Rada
Party of Regions politicians
Antonov
Ukrainian test pilots
Recipients of the title of Hero of Ukraine
Recipients of the Order of Gold Star (Ukraine)
Recipients of the Order of Merit (Ukraine), 3rd class
Soviet test pilots